Ludwig "Luigi" Hussak (31 July 1883 – 5 July 1965) was an Austrian amateur Association football player.

International career
Hussak was a member of the Austrian Olympic squad at the 1912 Summer Olympics and played two matches in the main tournament as well as two matches in the consolation tournament. He scored one goal against Italy in the semi-final of the consolation tournament.

For the senior Austrian national team he made his debut in April 1905 against Hungary. He played 14 games and scored 5 goals.

References

External links
Player profile – Austria Archive 

1883 births
1965 deaths
Austrian footballers
Austria international footballers
Olympic footballers of Austria
Footballers at the 1912 Summer Olympics
Association football forwards